Sakhuwani is a village in the Atrouli VDC of Sarlahi District in the Janakpur Zone of Nepal.

References 
https://web.archive.org/web/20090106192419/http://www.ngiip.gov.np/pdf/vol2sarlahi.pdf

https://www.facebook.com/ShakuwaniVillage

Populated places in Sarlahi District